Pulgaon railway station serves Pulgaon in Wardha district in the Indian state of Maharashtra. Pulgaon is on the banks of Wardha River.

History
The first train in India travelled from Mumbai to Thane on 16 April 1853. By May 1854, Great Indian Peninsula Railway's Bombay–Thane line was extended to Kalyan.  Bhusawal railway station was set up in 1860 and in 1867 the GIPR branch line was extended to Nagpur.

In 1917, Arvi was linked with Pulgaon with a -long  narrow-gauge railway by Central Provinces Railway. Central Railway now runs two trains a day on weekdays. The round trip takes a little over three hours.

Electrification
The railways in the Badnera–Wardha sector were electrified in 1990–91.

Amenities
Pulgaon railway station has the following amenities: waiting room and light refreshment stall.

Gallery

References

External links
  Trains at Pulgaon

Railway stations in Wardha district
Railway junction stations in India
Nagpur CR railway division
Railway stations opened in 1867
Nagpur-Badnera rail line